Adaviravulapadu is a village in Nandigama mandal, located in NTR district of Andhra Pradesh, India.

Demographics
According to 2011 Census of India, the village has a population of 2,101: 1038 female and 1063 male.

References 

Villages in NTR district